Popeye K is a  Dutch Warmblood stallion that competes on the "A" circuit in show hunter classes.

Breeding
Popeye K was bred in Ashton, Ontario at Ashland farm. Popeye K is by the great show jumper Voltaire, who has produced several offspring that compete at the international level or are excellent sires themselves, including Finesse, Helios, Play it Again, Altair, and Concorde. The dam of Popeye K includes the great show jumper and sire Ramiro Z, who was the leading sire of jumpers in the world throughout much of the 1990s, and who produced the likes of Ratina Z, Zamira, and Donau.

Pedigree for Popeye K
1997 Bay colt

Show career
Popeye K began training in 1999, before attempting his Canadian Warmblood testing in September 2001 during which he finished Reserve Champion. In 2002, Popeye K was shipped down to Ocala, Florida to begin his show career, where he competed in the Pre-Green Hunters. The following year he was sent to Virginia to train with the great hunter rider Tommy Serio, before continuing his show career.

Popeye K has had great success in the show ring. He was named the Horse of the Year Green Conformation Hunter by the United States Equestrian Federation in 2004, and in 2005 was named Show Hunter of the Year by The Chronicle of the Horse magazine. In both 2005 and 2006 he was named the Reserve Horse of the Year by the USEF and the Regular Conformation Hunter of the Year by the Show Hunter Hall of Fame. In 2005, 2006 and 2007, he was named the Winter Equestrian Festival Circuit Champion in the Regular Conformation Hunter division. He is known for his jumping ability and great temperament.

Breeding career
Popeye K has several hundred offspring. He continually passes on his exceptional conformation, lovely movement, and powerful, correct jump, as well as flashy markings.

Results
2000
 Stallion Performance Test (as a Show Hunter):
- 79.5% total

- Conformation: 82%

- Movement: 78.5%

- Type: 77%

- Received a “10” for scope and technique in the course jumping

 Winner of the Governor General's Cup at the Royal Agricultural Winter Fair
 2nd Lieutenant Governor's Cup

2003
 West Palm Beach: last place for the circuit in the Green Conformation Hunters
 Pennsylvania National Horse Show: Reserve Champion
 Washington International Horse Show: Reserve Champion
 National Leader in the Green Conformation Division

2004
 United States Equestrian Federation Green Conformation Hunter Champion
 PHR National Silver Stirrup (Green Working Hunter Champion)
 Reserve Champion WEF Circuit
 Winner WCHR Alabama Clay Conformation Hunter award

2005
 Regular Conformation Hunter Champion at the Winter Equestrian Festival

References

Hunt seat horses
Individual warmbloods
1997 animal births
Dutch Warmbloods